Cycling  at the 2022 European Youth Summer Olympic Festival was held at the City routes of Banská Bystrica in Banská Bystrica, Slovakia from 26 to 29 July 2022.

Medal table

Medalists

References

European Youth Summer Olympic Festival
2022 European Youth Summer Olympic Festival
Cycling in Slovakia
2022